Post-consumer waste is a waste type produced by the end consumer of a material stream; that is, where the waste-producing use did not involve the production of another product.

The terms of pre-consumer and post-consumer recycled materials are not defined in the ISO standard number 14021 (1999) but pre-consumer and post-consumer materials are. These definitions are the most widely recognized and verified definitions as used by manufacturers and procurement officers worldwide.

Quite commonly, it is simply the waste that individuals routinely discard, either in a waste receptacle or a dump, or by littering, incinerating, pouring down the drain, or washing into the gutter.

Post-consumer waste is distinguished from pre-consumer waste, which is the reintroduction of manufacturing scrap (such as trimmings from paper production, defective aluminum cans, etc.) back into the manufacturing process.  Pre-consumer waste is commonly used in manufacturing industries, and is often not considered recycling in the traditional sense.

Types

Post-consumer waste consists of:
packaging
parts that are not needed, such as fruit skins, bones in meat, etc.
undesired things received, e.g.:
advertising material in the mailbox
a flyer received in the street without having the opportunity to refuse
dust, weeds, fallen leaves, etc.
things one no longer needs, e.g. a magazine that has been read, things replaced by new versions, clothes out of fashion, remaining food that one cannot keep or does not want to keep
broken things, things no longer working, spoiled food, worn-out clothes, clothes which no longer fit
outgrown items toys, clothing, books, schoolwork
disposables such as Kleenex and finished batteries
human waste, waste of pets, waste water from various forms of cleaning
"post-life waste"
one's body or ashes
things people do not want and cannot sell
broken/unused cars
items that cannot be used

Legal issues

In many countries, such as the United States, there is no reasonable expectation of privacy in post-consumer waste once it leaves the consumer's home.  Anyone can search it, including the police, and any incriminating evidence recovered can be used at trial. This doctrine was established in The California v. Greenwood  case, in which the U.S. Supreme Court held that there is no common law expectation of privacy for discarded materials. This has since led people to argue the legality of taking post-consumer waste for salvage value.

Excessive Waste
Especially within the food system, there is a lot of waste occurring at the consumer end. Post-consumer waste accounts for a large amount of food that is wasted. This can be attributed to many reasons, one of which being the way in which food is labeled. According to a study published in 2020, the confusing labeled of use by, consume by, or sell by dates are a significant reason why food is wasted at such a high volume when the food is otherwise entirely edible. Another way is the way that food is used once it reaches the average consumer household due to many factors, with the main factors being social, behavioral, and personal purchasing habits. Additionally, each of those factors influence each other and affect the amount of food that is wasted per person.

See also
Retail hazardous waste

References

Waste